Ricardo Díaz Bach (6 September 1939 – 8 August 2011) was a Salvadoran footballer.

Club career
Nicknamed el Nene, Díaz played club football in El Salvador, before going to Chile to play professionally at Universidad de Concepción and C.D. Huachipato.

International career
Díaz was part of the El Salvador national football team that won Central American and Caribbean games in 1956.

External links
 Falleció Ricardo “el Nene” Díaz Bach - El Grafico 

1939 births
2011 deaths
Salvadoran footballers
Salvadoran expatriate footballers
El Salvador international footballers
C.D. Huachipato footballers
Universidad de Concepción footballers
Once Municipal footballers
Expatriate footballers in Chile
Salvadoran expatriate sportspeople in Chile
Association football forwards